Hem (West Frisian: Him) (population estimate: 1230) is a village in the municipality Drechterland, located in the north west of the Netherlands, in the province of North Holland and the region of West-Frisia.

The village was first mentioned around 1312 as Hem, and means "silted land in a bend of a stream". Hem developed in the 12th century as a peat excavation settlement.

The tower of the Dutch Reformed church dates from around 1500. The baluster and spire were constructed after a 1897 fire. The matching church was demolished in 1972 after a fire. The Catholic St Lucas Church is an aisleless church from 1930. Hem was home to 591 people in 1840.

Notable people
Alice Besseling, politician

Gallery

References 

Populated places in North Holland
Former municipalities of North Holland
Drechterland